Rishonim (sing. , Rishon, "the first ones") were the leading rabbis and poskim who lived approximately during the 11th to 15th centuries, in the era before the writing of the Shulchan Aruch ("Set Table", a common printed code of Jewish law, 1563 CE) and following the Geonim (589-1038 CE). Rabbinic scholars subsequent to the Shulchan Aruch are generally known as acharonim ("the latter ones").

The distinction between the rishonim and the geonim is meaningful historically; in halakha (Jewish Law) the distinction is less important. According to a widely held view in Orthodox Judaism, the acharonim generally cannot dispute the rulings of rabbis of previous eras unless they find support from other rabbis in previous eras. On the other hand, this view is not formally a part of halakha itself, and according to some rabbis is a violation of the halakhic system. In The Principles of Jewish Law, Orthodox rabbi Menachem Elon writes that:

List of Rishonim

 Eleazar of Worms (haRokeah), 12th century German halakhist. 
 Judah ben Samuel of Regensburg (Hasidim), 12th century German mystic and halakhist. 
 Abraham ben Nathan (HaManhig), 13th century Provençal Talmudist.
 Moses de León (Zohar), 13th century Spanish Kabbalist.
 Isaac ibn Ghiyyat (Me'ah She'arim), 11th century Spanish halakhist and commentator.
 Moses ben Meir of Ferrara, 13th century Tosafist.
 Eliezer ben Samuel of Metz (Yereim), 13th century Tosafist.
 Eliezer ben Samuel of Verona, 13th century Tosafist.
 Immanuel of Rome, 14th century Italian poet (1261-)
 Benjamin ben Judah, 14th century Italian exegete.
 Benjamin ben Isaac of Carcassonne, 14th century scholar.
 Judah ben Benjamin Anaw, 13th century Italian halakhist and Talmudist
 Zedekiah ben Abraham Anaw (Shibbolei HaLeqet), 13th century Italian halakhist (-1280)
 Benjamin ben Abraham Anaw, 13th century poet, exegete, and halakhist. (d. )
 Abba Mari, (Minhat Kenaot), 13th century Provençal rabbi (c. 1250-c. 1306)
 Isaac ben Abba Mari (Ittur Soferim), 12th century Provençal rabbi (c. 1122 – c. 1193) 
 Jacob ben Meir, 12th century Talmudist, halakhist, and Biblical philologist (1100–1171)

 Simhah ben Samuel of Vitry, 11th century French Talmudist(?-1105)
 Shemaiah of Soissons, 12th century Talmudist and Biblical exegete
 Crescas Vidal, 14th century Talmudist and philosopher
 Joseph Kara, 12th century Biblical exegete. (c. 1065 – c. 1135)
 Isaiah di Trani, 12th century Biblical exegete and halakhist. (c. 1180 – c. 1250)
 Isaiah di Trani the Younger, 13th century Biblical exegete and halakhist
 Don Isaac Abravanel, (Abarbanel), 15th century philosopher and Torah commentator (1437–1508)
 Israel Bruna, (Mahari Bruna), 15th century German Rabbi and Posek
 Abraham ibn Daud, (Sefer HaKabbalah), 12th century Spanish philosopher
 Abraham ibn Ezra, (Ibn Ezra), 12th century Spanish-North African Biblical commentator
 David Abudirham, said to be a student of the Baal Ha-Turim (but this is doubtful)
 Samuel ben Jacob Jam'a, 12th century North African rabbi and scholar
 Asher ben Jehiel, (Rosh), 13th century German-Spanish Talmudist
 Moses Kimhi, 12th century biblical commentator and grammarian.
 David Kimhi, (RaDaK) 12th century French biblical commentator, philosopher, and grammarian
 Yaakov ben Moshe Levi Moelin, (Maharil), 14th century codifier of German minhag
 Obadiah ben Abraham of Bertinoro, (Bartenura), 15th century commentator on the Mishnah
 Meir of Rothenburg, 13th century German rabbi and poet
 Bahya ibn Paquda, (Hovot ha-Levavot), 11th century Spanish philosopher and moralist
 Hasdai Crescas, (Or Hashem), 14th century Talmudist and philosopher
 Dunash ben Labrat, 10th century grammarian and poet
 Rabbenu Gershom, 11th century German Talmudist and legalist
 Isaac ben Moses of Vienna, 13th century Bohemian Posek
 Gersonides, Levi ben Gershom, (Ralbag), 14th century French Talmudist and philosopher
Eliezer ben Nathan, 12th century poet and pietist
 Hillel ben Eliakim, (Rabbeinu Hillel), 12th century Talmudist and disciple of Rashi
 Ibn Tibbon, a family of 12th and 13th century Spanish and French scholars, translators, and leaders
 Isaac Alfasi, (the Rif), 11th century North African and Spanish Talmudist and Halakhist; author of "Sefer Ha-halachoth"
 Jacob ben Asher, (Baal ha-Turim ; Arbaah Turim), 14th century German-Spanish Halakhist
 Jonah ibn Janah, 11th century Hebrew grammarian
 Joseph Albo, (Sefer Ikkarim), 15th century Spain
 Joseph ibn Migash 12th century Spanish Talmudist and rosh yeshiva; teacher of Maimon, father of Maimonides
 Meir Abulafia, (Yad Ramah), 13th century Spanish Talmudist
Maimonides, Moshe Ben Maimon, (Rambam), 12th century Spanish-North African Talmudist, philosopher, and law codifier
 Mordecai ben Hillel, (The Mordechai), 13th century German Halakhist
 Nahmanides, Moshe ben Nahman, (Ramban), 13th century Spanish and Holy Land mystic and Talmudist
 Nissim of Gerona, (RaN), 14th century Halakhist and Talmudist
 Rashi, (Solomon ben Yitzchak), 11th century French Talmudist, the primary commentator of Talmud
 Elazar Rokeach, (Sefer HaRokeach), 12th century German rabbinic scholar
 Samuel ben Judah ibn Tibbon, 12th-13th century French Maimonidean philosopher and translator
 Tosafists, (Tosafot), 11th, 12th and 13th century Talmudic scholars in France and Germany
 Yehuda Halevi, (Kuzari), 12th century Spanish philosopher and poet devoted to Zion
 Menachem Meiri, (Meiri), 13th century Talmudist
 Yom Tov Asevilli, (Ritva), 13th century Talmudist
 Yitzhak Saggi Nehor, (Isaac the Blind), 12th-13th century Provençal Kabbalist
 Solomon ben Aderet, (Rashba), 13th century Talmudist
 Aharon HaLevi, (Ra'ah), 13th century Talmudist
 Zerachiah ha-Levi of Girona, (Baal Ha-Maor) 12th century Talmudist
 Meshullam ben Jacob, (Rabbeinu Meshullam Hagodol), 12th century Talmudist.(1235-1310)
 Joseph Caspi, 13th–14th century talmudist, grammarian, and philosopher. (1280—1345)
 Bahya ben Asher ibn Halawa, 13th-14th century commentator, Talmudist and Kabbalist

See also
Rabbinic literature
Eras of history important in Jewish law
List of rabbis
History of Responsa: Rishonim

References

External links
The Rules of Halacha, Rabbi Aryeh Kaplan
The different rabbinic eras, faqs.org
RabbiMap - interactive map showing where the rishonim and other notable rabbis lived 
Torah Personalities and the Times in Which They Lived (MP3s), Rabbi R. Y. Eisenman
9th Through 11th Century
12th Century
13th Century
14th Century
15th Century
16th Century

 
Hebrew words and phrases
6